Shugo Chara! is a Japanese shōjo manga series created by the manga author duo, Peach-Pit. The story centers on elementary school girl Amu Hinamori, whose popular exterior, referred to as "cool and spicy" by her classmates, contrasts with her introverted personality. When Amu wishes for the courage to be reborn as her would-be self, she is surprised to find three colorful eggs the next morning, which hatch into three Guardian Characters: Ran, Miki, and Su.

In December 2005, Peach Pit announced that they were working on a new shōjo manga series called Shugo Chara! The first chapter was published in the February 2006 edition of Nakayoshi magazine and ran until the January 2010 edition. The first volume collection was then republished on July 6, 2006 by Nakayoshis publisher Kodansha. In addition to the regular volumes, the series was released in limited editions in Japan, each of which included different cover art from the regular editions, metallic foil sleeves, and a set of postcards featuring Amu in various outfits and poses following the color theme of the dust jackets. Del Rey Manga announced that it acquired the English language rights to Shugo Chara! during MangaNEXT 2006 and released the first volume on March 27, 2007.

The series was put on hiatus along with two other series, Rozen Maiden and Zombie-Loan, in December 2008 due to a sudden illness and hospitalization of one of the authors. One month later, Peach-Pit announced that all three series will resume and thanked their fans for the support during the illness.

A sequel title, Shugo Chara! Encore!, was announced to  begin in the April 2010 issue of Nakayoshi.
Four chapters of Encore! were released in October 2010 as volume 12 of the manga.

Volume list
Note: Volume titles are from the Del Rey (then latter Kodansha USA) releases.

References

External links 
Shugo Chara! (part of Peach-Pit official website) 
Shugo Chara! at Del Rey Manga

Volumes
Shugo Chara!